Exodus of the Deemed Unrighteous is Lincoln Durham's second studio album, released on October 22, 2013, on Droog Records. Durham teamed up with drummer Rick Richard and producer George Reiff for the second time for his follow up album to The Shovel vs. the Howling Bones. Durham plays a variety of instruments on the album, playing his guitar and other instruments including a cigar box guitar, an old Samsonite case, piano, lap steel guitar, harmonica, and a banjo.

Track list

Personnel

Musicians
 Lincoln Durham – vocals, guitar, fiddle, harmonica, lap steel guitar, piano, wind chimes
 Rick Richards – drums, percussion, hand-clapping
Special guest musicians
 George Reiff - kalimba, hand-clapping, background vocals
 Alissa Durham - hand-clapping, background vocals

References

2013 albums
Lincoln Durham albums